Heroes for my Son is a 2010 non-fiction book written by Brad Meltzer. It contains a series of vignettes on inspiring heroes - famous and lesser known - whose stories Brad wanted to share with his son. According to WorldCat, the book is in 737 libraries.

Meltzer's Heroes for My Daughter was published later in 2012.

Contents 
The book contains vignettes, quotations, and black and white photos of Meltzer's heroes, with details on their "character-building values":

 The Wright Brothers
 Team Hoyt
 Joe Shuster and Jerry Siegel
 Mr. Rogers
 Miep Gies
 Roberto Clemente
 Amelia Earhart
 Nelson Mandela
 Norman Borlaug
 Martin Luther King Jr.
 Anne Sullivan
 John Lennon
 Harriet Tubman
 Harry Houdini
 Jackie Robinson
 Albert Einstein
 Jesse Owens
 Jim Henson
 Jonas Salk
 Dr. Seuss
 Bella Abzug
 Dan West
 Mother Teresa
 Steven Spielberg
 George H. W. Bush
 Lucille Ball
 George Washington
 Charlie Chaplin
 Oprah Winfrey
 Frank Shankwitz
 Mark Twain
 Eleanor Roosevelt
 Neil Armstrong
 Paul Newman
 Pelé
 Barbara Johns
 Aung San Suu Kyi
 Eli Segal
 Abraham Lincoln
 Andy Miyares (Special Olympics swimmer)
 Clara Hale
  Muhammad Ali
 Barack Obama
 Harper Lee
 Thomas Jefferson
 Mahatma Gandhi
 Frederick Douglass
 Chesley B. Sullenberger
 Rosa Parks
 Lou Gehrig
  Teri Meltzer (the author's mother)
  Ben Rubin (the author's maternal grandfather)

Inspiration 
Brad Meltzer began collecting a list of heroes whose virtues and skills he wanted to share with his son when he grew up. The list grew to fifty-two people.

Press 
The book reached number two on the New York Times Bestseller List.

References

External links 
 Official website

2010 non-fiction books
Books by Brad Meltzer